Verkhnekardailsky is a rural locality (a khutor) and the administrative center of Verkhnekardailskoye Rural Settlement, Novonikolayevsky District, Volgograd Oblast, Russia. The population was 869 as of 2010. There are 17 streets.

Geography 
Verkhnekardailsky is located in steppe, on the Khopyorsko-Buzulukskaya Plain, on the right bank of the Kardail River, 28 km northeast of Novonikolayevsky (the district's administrative centre) by road. Nikolayevsky is the nearest rural locality.

References 

Rural localities in Novonikolayevsky District